Lamotis was an ancient region on the eastern coast of Cilicia Trachea, later Cilicia Aspera, between the  Calycadnus river and the Lamos river. Its capital was Antiochia Lamotis.  (Ptolemy Book V, ch. 8, § 6; Strabo, Geography, 14.5.6-7)

External links
Hazlitt's Classical Gazetteer

Ancient Cilicia